The 2022 Armenian Cup Final was the 31st Armenian Cup Final, and the final match of the 2021–22 Armenian Cup. It was played at the Republican Stadium in Yerevan, Armenia, on 8 May 2022, contested by Noravank and Urartu. This was Noravank's first appearance in the Final of the Armenian Cup and Urartu's ninth appearance, with Noravank winning 2–0 to win their first title, however the club folded prior to the start of the next season after not obtaining an UEFA license and where replaced in the UEFA Europa Conference League by the fourth placed league team, Ararat Yerevan.

Match

Details

Notes

References

Armenian Cup Finals
Cup Final